No Home Record is the debut solo album by Kim Gordon. The album was produced by Justin Raisen after the two met in an Airbnb, and is named after Chantal Akerman's 2015 documentary No Home Movie. The album has received positive reviews.

Background
No Home Record is Kim Gordon's first solo album in her 38-year music career. According to Gordon, she decided to start working on the album after meeting producer Justin Raisen in an Airbnb rental a few years prior to the album's recording. Raisen asked her to sing on a project that he had been working on, which became the basis for the song "Murdered Out". The two decided to continue working on a solo album. It was released on October 11, 2019.

Music and production
The music from the album has been called a "feast of disorienting beats" by NPR writer Lars Gotrich, and includes instruments such as oboe and guitar. Chantal Akerman's 2015 documentary film called No Home Movie inspired Gordon to name her album the same and give it sense and context.

Critical reception

No Home Record was met with generally positive reviews. At Metacritic, which assigns a weighted average rating out of 100 to reviews from professional publications, the album received an average score of 80, based on 26 reviews.

The album received perfect scores from Laura Snapes of The Guardian, who said that it "brilliantly weds noise textures to pop dynamics", and Joe Creely of The Skinny, who called it a "superb genre-spanning solo debut" and "a real joy of an album". Danijela Bočev of The Quietus said "The album dazzles with the thrilling cocktail of styles Gordon's been through, as if changing channels on the coolest radio on earth." Pitchforks Philip Sherburne called her solo debut "thrilling" and said it was "shot through with the beautiful, unsparing noise that has always defined her art." Reviewing for The Observer, Kitty Empire found it to be "quiet a feat" for Gordon to "connect 70s No Wave with the mischievous end of contemporary digital production" on "punishing, three-dimensional soundscapes" like "AirBnB" and "American idea". In his Substack-published "Consumer Guide" column, Robert Christgau also highlighted the musical accomplishment of the album and recommended it be heard on quality speakers: "The guitars credited throughout meld with the electronics that dominate in a rough but also eloquently textured construct that complements the fragility and directness of Gordon’s sometimes pained, sometimes whispery vocals."

Some reviewers were more critical. El Hunt of NME called the album "uneasy and scratchy", and a "restless listen". In an otherwise positive review for Rolling Stone, David Browne said that "Gordon's ever elliptical" lyrics lack the candor and personal insight of her 2015 memoir Girl in a Band.

Track listing

Personnel
Kim Gordon - vocals, guitar, drum machine; bass on Hungry Baby"
Justin Raisen - programming, synthesizer, guitar, bass; organ on "Hungry Baby"
with:
Anthony Paul Lopez - drums on "Air BnB"
Jeremiah Raisen - programming, keyboards on "Paprika Pony"
Stella Mozgawa - drums on "Murdered Out"
Jake Messina Meginsky - drums, bass, tape loops on "Don't Play It"
Shawn Everett - drum machine on "Cookie Butter"
Bosh Bruiser Rothman - drums on "Hungry Baby" and "Earthquake"
Technical
Anthony Paul Lopez, Jake Messina Meginsky, Justin Raisen, Shawn Everett - engineer
Mike Zimmerman - art direction
Josephine Pryde - front cover photography

Charts

References

2019 debut albums
Matador Records albums
Albums produced by Justin Raisen